Julián Andiano (born 28 November 1951) is a Spanish racing cyclist. He rode in the 1975 Tour de France.

References

External links
 

1951 births
Living people
Spanish male cyclists
People from Errenteria
Sportspeople from Gipuzkoa
Cyclists from the Basque Country (autonomous community)
20th-century Spanish people
21st-century Spanish people